45 kDa calcium-binding protein is a protein that in humans is encoded by the SDF4 gene.

References

Further reading

EF-hand-containing proteins